Conrad Davis Totman (born January 5, 1934) is an American  American environmental historian, Japanologist, and translator.  Totman was a Professor Emeritus at Yale University.

Early life
Totman was born in Conway, Massachusetts. He did his undergraduate studies at the and subsequently earned a in East Asian history at Harvard University in 1964. He enlisted in the army in 1953. He served with the 8th Preventive Medicine Control Detachment in South Korea arriving 5 June 1954, just after the Korean War.

Career
Totman taught Japanese history at the University of California at Santa Barbara, at Northwestern University, and Yale. He retired from Yale in 1997.

Select works
Totman's published writings encompass 39 works in 145 publications in 4 languages and 7,885 library holdings.

 Politics in the Tokugawa Bakufu, 1600-1843, 1967
 The Collapse of the Tokugawa Bakufu, 1862-1868, 1980 
 Japan Before Perry: A Short History, 1981
 Tokugawa Ieyasu: Shogun, 1983 
 The Origins of Japan's Modern Forests: The Case of Akita, 1985 
 The Green Archipelago: Forestry in Preindustrial Japan, 1989 
 Tokugawa Japan: The Social and Economic Antecedents of Modern Japan, 1990
 Early Modern Japan, 1993 
 The Lumber Industry in Early Modern Japan, 1995 
 A History of Japan, 2000 
 Pre-industrial Korea and Japan in Environmental Perspective, 2004 
 Japan's Imperial Forest, Goryorin, 1889-1945: with a supporting study of the Kan/Min division of woodland in early Meiji Japan, 1871-76, 2007
 Japan: An Environmental History, 2014

References

External links
  Yale faculty website

1934 births
Living people
21st-century American historians
21st-century American male writers
American Japanologists
American male non-fiction writers
Environmental historians
Harvard University alumni
People from Conway, Massachusetts
United States Army soldiers
University of Massachusetts Amherst alumni
Yale University faculty